Fath was a Persian-language daily newspaper published in Iran.

History
Fath was published by virtually the same team of journalists that published Khordad, led by Yadollah Eslami. It was banned in April 2000 for publishing articles which "disparaged Islam and the religious elements of the Islamic revolution."

See also
List of newspapers in Iran

References

2000 disestablishments in Iran
Defunct newspapers published in Iran
Newspapers published in Tehran
Persian-language newspapers
Publications disestablished in 2000
Publications with year of establishment missing